Armin Henry Meyer (19 January 1914, in Fort Wayne, Indiana – 13 August 2006) was an American diplomat who served as United States Ambassador to Lebanon (1961 to 1965), United States Ambassador to Iran (1965-1969), and United States Ambassador to Japan (1969-1972).

Meyer found his tenure in Japan to be ”particularly challenging ... because he faced the task of ‘easing the shock of President Nixon’s historic breakthrough to China.’”. While in Japan, he led negotiations which ultimately let to the return of Japanese sovereignty in Japan. Richard Nixon creates a task force on international terrorism after Israeli athletes were killed at the 1972 Olympic Games in Munich.  Meyer returned to the State Department to head the task force.

Meyer's parents were Armin P., a Lutheran minister, and Leona Buss Meyer. Leona died when Armin was three and then he was raised by three aunts in Lincoln, Illinois.

Meyer graduated from Capital University in 1939. In 1941, he earned a master's degree in mathematics at Ohio State University. In 1943, Meyer joined the staff of the United States Office of War Information in Cairo.

Publications
Assignment Tokyo: An Ambassador's Journal (1974)

References

External links
U.S.-Japan Relations and the Opening to China: Nancy Bernkopf Tucker

Ambassadors of the United States to Iran
Ambassadors of the United States to Japan
Ambassadors of the United States to Lebanon
Capital University alumni
Ohio State University Graduate School alumni
1914 births
2006 deaths
20th-century American diplomats